38 Special is the debut studio album by American rock band 38 Special, released in 1977 by A&M Records. It was remastered and reissued on the Lemon record label in 2003.  Two singles, "Long Time Gone" (A&M 1946-S) and "Tell Everybody" (A&M 1964-S), were released, but neither charted on the Billboard Hot 100.

"Around and Around" is a cover of a 1958 song by Chuck Berry.

Track listing

Personnel

38 Special
Donnie Van Zant – lead vocals
Don Barnes – guitar, background vocals
Jeff Carlisi – guitar, pedal steel, dobro
Ken Lyons – bass
Steve Brookins – drums, percussion
Jack Grondin – drums

Additional personnel
Terry Emery – piano
Dan Hartman – piano on "Fly Away"
Larry Junstrom – bass on "Fly Away"
Carl Hall – background vocals on "Tell Everybody," "Just Hang On" and "Fly Away"
Lani Groves – background vocals on "Tell Everybody," "Just Hang On" and "Fly Away"
Joslyn Brown – background vocals on "Tell Everybody," "Just Hang On" and "Fly Away"

Production
Produced by Dan Hartman
Recorded, engineered and mixed by Dave Still (at "The School House")
Mastered by Greg Calbi (at Sterling Sound in New York City)

Charts
Album – Billboard (United States)

References

External links 
"38 Special" at discogs

38 Special (band) albums
1977 debut albums
A&M Records albums
Albums produced by Dan Hartman